Trombidium heterotrichum is a species of mite in the genus Trombidium in the family Trombidiidae. It is found in Europe.

References
 Synopsis of the described Arachnida of the World: Trombidiidae

Further reading
  (1910): Lista di nuove specie e nuovi generi di Acari.

Trombidiidae
Animals described in 1910
Arachnids of Europe